Rum Creek may refer to:

Rum Creek (Ocmulgee River tributary), a stream in Georgia
Rum Creek (West Virginia), a stream in West Virginia